Pathariya may refer to:

 Pathariya, Nepal, a village in Nepal
 Patharia, a town in Damoh district, Madhya Pradesh, India
 Pathariya, Bhopal, a village in Bhopal district, Madhya Pradesh, India
 Pathariya (Vidhan Sabha constituency), a legislative constituency in Madhya Pradesh, India